Burton Jesse Hendrick (December 8, 1870 – March 23, 1949), born in New Haven, Connecticut, was an American author.  While attending Yale University, Hendrick was editor of both The Yale Courant and The Yale Literary Magazine. He received his BA in 1895 and his master's in 1897 from Yale. After completing his degree work, Hendrick became editor of the New Haven Morning News. In 1905, after writing for The New York Evening Post and The New York Sun, Hendrick left newspapers and became a "muckraker" writing for McClure's Magazine.  His "The Story of Life-Insurance" exposé appeared in McClure's in 1906. Following his career at  McClure's, Hendrick went to work in 1913 at Walter Hines Page's World's Work magazine as an associate editor. In 1919, Hendrick began writing biographies, when he was the ghostwriter of Ambassador Morgenthau's Story for Henry Morgenthau, Sr.

In 1921 he won the Pulitzer Prize for History for The Victory at Sea, which he co-authored with William Sowden Sims, the 1923 Pulitzer Prize for Biography or Autobiography for The Life and Letters of Walter H. Page, and the 1929 Pulitzer Prize for Biography or Autobiography for The Training of An American.

In 1919 Hendrick published the Age of Big Business by using a series of individual biographies to create an enthusiastic look at the foundation of the corporation in America and the rapid rise of the United States as a world power.  After completing the commissioned biography of Andrew Carnegie, Hendrick turned to writing group biographies. There is an obvious gap in the later works published by Hendrick between 1940 and 1946, which is explained by his work on a biography on Andrew Mellon, which was commissioned by the Mellon family, but never published.

At the time of his death, Hendrick was working on a biography of Louise Whitfield Carnegie, the wife of Andrew Carnegie.

Books
1919 Ambassador Morgenthau's Story
1920 The Victory at Sea (with William Sims)
1921 
1923 Life and Letters of Walter H Page
1923 
1924 
1928 The Training Of An American: The Earlier Life and Letters of Walter H Page
1932 The Life of Andrew Carnegie
1935 The Lees of Virginia: Biography of a Family
1937 Bulwark of the Republic, A Biography of the Constitution
1939 Statesmen of the Lost Cause: Jefferson Davis and his Cabinet
1946 Lincoln's War Cabinet

See also
The Life of Mary Baker G. Eddy and the History of Christian Science
The Story of Life Insurance (a series of articles published in McClure's Magazine in 1906, and compiled into a book during the following year.)

References

 'To Cast Them in the Heroic Mold' Court Biographers – The Case of Burton Jesse Hendrick by Dr. Robert J. Rusnak, Rosary College, River Forest, IL copyright 1996.
 'Burton Hendrick obituary', New York Times, March 25, 1949.

External links
 
 
 
 Books by Hendrick at manybooks.net
 
 Burton Jesse Hendrick Papers (MS 1980). Manuscripts and Archives, Yale University Library.



1870 births
1949 deaths
American biographers
American male biographers
Pulitzer Prize for History winners
Pulitzer Prize for Biography or Autobiography winners
Writers from New Haven, Connecticut
Progressive Era in the United States